Montbrison is a commune and a subprefecture of the Loire department in central France.

Montbrison was the historical capital of the counts of Forez, and today it is the principal city in the Forez.

The commune gives its name to the popular blue cheese Fourme de Montbrison, which has been made in the region for centuries. It received Appellation d'Origine Contrôlée status in 1972.

History
The town of Montbrison was founded in the area around the lords' castles in the Forez region, of which Montbrison would later become the capital. The earliest recorded reference to the town dates to 870CE.

The town was fortified following the attacks by the English army at the start of the Hundred Years War. During the Religious Wars, Montbrison was captured and pillaged by the Protestant forces of François de Beaumont in 1562, with the town's garrison thrown from the ramparts onto spikes placed by the attackers.

The Convent of the Visitation was founded in 1643 during a period of severe famine. The town suffered a series of poor harvests as well as an outbreak of the plague between the years 1648–1653. The Augustinian Convent was founded in 1654, followed by the Hospital to house the poor in 1659. The Ursuline Convent closed in 1851.

Key dates
1892 - execution of Ravachol, a noted anarchist
1909 - electrical power reaches the town
1940 - (June) the Forez region is occupied by German troops, with Montbrison falling into the 'free' zone. The forces withdrew at the start of July
1944 - (August) Montbrison liberated
1954 - Water treatment plant built
1968 - Jacquou le Croquant broadcast on television
1972 - local cheese Fourme de Montbrison receives Appellation d'Origine Contrôlée status

Population

Twin towns
Montbrison is twinned with:

  Sežana, Slovenia
  Eichstätt, Germany

Personalities
 Christophe Agou (1969–), photographer
 Pierre Boulez (1925–2016), composer and conductor
 Guillaume Cizeron (1994–), ice dancer Three-time world champion (2015–2016, 2018) and four-time European champion (2015–2018)
 Philippe Delaye (1975–), footballer
 Estienne Du Tronchet (c.1510–c.1580), writer
 Victor de Laprade (1812–1882) poet
 Mickey 3D, pop group
 Sarah Mikovski, singer-songwriter
 Marie-Anne Pierette Paulze (1758–1836), wife of Antoine Lavoisier
 Michael Portier, Bishop of Mobile, Alabama
 Ravachol, anarchist
 Muriel Robin (1955), actress
 Yves Triantafyllos (1948–), footballer

References

External links
Official town site

 
Communes of Loire (department)
Subprefectures in France
Segusiavi
Forez